Ancylis upupana is a moth of the family Tortricidae. It is found in most of Europe (except Iceland, Ireland, the Iberian Peninsula and most of the Balkan Peninsula), east to Russia and China.

The wingspan is 13–20 mm. Adults are on wing from May to June. There is one generation per year.

The larvae feed on Ulmus, Betula and Quercus. They spin a folded leaf or multiple leaves together into a pod and feed from within. It partly skeletonises the leaves.

References

External links 
UKmoths
Lepiforum.de

Moths described in 1835
Moths of Asia
Tortricidae of Europe
Taxa named by Georg Friedrich Treitschke